Photovoltaic retinal prosthesis is a technology for restoring sight to patients blinded by degenerative retinal diseases, such as retinitis pigmentosa and age-related macular degeneration (AMD), when patients lose the 'image capturing' photoreceptors, but neurons in the 'image-processing' inner retinal layers are relatively well-preserved. This subretinal prosthesis is designed to restore a patients' sight by electrically stimulating the surviving inner retinal neurons, primarily the bipolar cells. Photovoltaic retinal implants are completely wireless and powered by near-infrared illumination (880nm) projected from the augmented-reality glasses. Therefore, they do not require such complex surgical methods as needed for other retinal implants, which are powered via extraocular electronics connected to the retinal array by a trans-scleral cable. Optical activation of the photovoltaic pixels allows scaling the implants to thousands of electrodes. 

Studies in rats with retinal degeneration demonstrated that prosthetic vision with such subretinal implants preserves many features of natural vision, including flicker fusion at high frequencies (>20 Hz), adaptation to static images, antagonistic center-surround organization and non-linear summation of subunits in receptive fields, providing high spatial resolution. Grating visual acuity measured with 70μm pixels matches the sampling density limit (pixel pitch). 

Clinical trial with these implants (PRIMA, Pixium Vision) having 100μm pixels demonstrated that AMD patients perceive letters and other patterns with spatial resolution closely matching the pixel size. Moreover, central prosthetic vision is perceived simultaneously with the remaining natural peripheral vision. 

Implants of a new design with pixel sizes down to 20μm are being developed by Palanker group at Stanford University.

References

External links 
Photovoltaic retinal prosthesis restores high-resolution responses to single-pixel stimulation in blind retinas
Emerging technologies
Blindness equipment
Applications of photovoltaics